Pearls is an album by Ronnie Drew in collaboration with a group called Grand Canal.  It consists mainly of poetry recited by Drew over music performed by the group.  Released in 2007, it also features previously released recordings from The Celtic Poets by Jah Wobble's Invaders of the Heart.

Track listing 
 "Providence"
 "Steel Boat Runners"
 "Gone in the Wind"
 "At the Tail End of a Hurricane"
 "About SuperHeroes"
 "London Rain"
 "Bagpipe Music"
 "The Dunes"
 "A Man I Knew"
 "Clear Air Turbulence"
 "Saturn"

Tracks 1, 2, 4, 5 and 10 by Grand Canal
Tracks 3, 6, 7, 8, 9 and 11 from The Celtic Poets by Jah Wobble's Invaders of the Heart

In 2008, this album was given away free with the Sunday Independent and featured an extra track called "Longing".

Ronnie Drew albums
2007 albums